Hsu Teng-yun (born 24 March 1936) is a Taiwanese boxer. He competed in the men's featherweight event at the 1960 Summer Olympics. At the 1960 Summer Olympics, he lost to William Meyers of South Africa in the Round of 16 after receiving a bye in the Round of 32.

References

1936 births
Living people
Taiwanese male boxers
Olympic boxers of Taiwan
Boxers at the 1960 Summer Olympics
Sportspeople from Kaohsiung
Featherweight boxers
20th-century Taiwanese people